Rudolf Weber may refer to:

 Rudolf Weber (aviator) (1890–1918), World War I flying ace
 Rudolf Weber (fencer) (1903–?), Austrian Olympic fencer
 Rudolf Weber (musicologist) (born 1937), musicologist
 Rudolf Weber (handballer) (born 1957), Swiss handballer
 Rudolf Weber (architect), co-designer of the Millennium Tower, Vienna, Austria
 Rudolf Weber (politician), President of the Swiss Council of States 1955/56